Gordy Haab (born 1976) is an American film, video game and television composer based in Los Angeles, California. His work has been featured in works associated with franchises including most recently Star Wars Battlefront II, for which he won Video Game Score of the Year from the American Society of Composers, Authors and Publishers. Haab is also known for his work on Microsoft's Halo Wars 2, for which he was nominated for a 2017 HMMA award. His score for Electronic Arts' Star Wars: Battlefront, won three awards at the 2016 GDC G.A.N.G. Awards: Music of the Year, Best Interactive Score, and Best Instrumental Score. Gordy has also been nominated for a BAFTA Games Awards for his work on 'Star Wars: Battlefront.'

His work and has been covered by publications, including the HuffPost, which said, "Star Wars Battlefront is sounding better and better everyday...this new Star Wars music will light your saber." In 2015, Hardcore Gamer was among the first to link Haab to his inspiration by saying, "Star Wars Battlefront features the best game score John Williams never wrote."  The Los Angeles Times has also recognized Haab's work, saying "the B-side to John Williams' score," and Billboard quoted Steve Schnur, the president of music for EA, as saying, "Gordy is one of the few composers in the world on Lucas' short list."

Early life 
Gordy developed an early interest in music when he was six and was particularly moved by the score of E.T. the Extra-Terrestrial. Gordy decided to pursue a career in the industry by attending the Virginia Commonwealth University, where he learned to compose music by hand and it remains his preferred composition method, telling The Sound Architect that, "I say this not to discredit the use of technology, because it also plays a major role in my process. But a piano, a blank page, and a pencil – and no screens glowing in my face – has a way of quieting my soul and allowing me to just, write." Haab received a bachelor's degree in Jazz Music Composition in 1999. He then went on to the University of Southern California, where he received his master's in Scoring for Motion Pictures in 2001.

Career 
Among other projects, Haab scored Activision/AMC's The Walking Dead: Survival Instinct, based on the TV series, and Microsoft's Kinect: Star Wars, which won Best Music at the Hollywood Music In Media Awards. Haab continues to compose the music for Electrionic Arts and Bioware's Star Wars: The Old Republic, for which he was awarded Best Original Soundtrack and Best Instrumental Music at the 10th Annual GDC G.A.N.G. Awards. He has recorded and conducted his music with various groups from all around the world, including the London Symphony Orchestra, the San Francisco Symphony, the Nashville Symphony, London Voices and the Hollywood Studio Orchestra.

Haab's other film, television and video game credits include Anchor Bay's Behind the Mask: The Rise of Leslie Vernon; MTV's The Truth Below;  Dave Barry's 'Guide to Guys;' Lionsgate's 'War;' The Oprah Winfrey Network's The Judds; Roadside Attractions Shrink; ABC's Greek; VH-1's Scream Queens;  and LucasArts' Indiana Jones and the Staff of Kings.

Discography

Video Games

Awards

References

External links 

Gordy Haab's Official Website
Variety Magazine on 'Halo Wars 2'
2017 Grammy's Screen Categories- Variety Magazine

1976 births
Living people
American film score composers
Place of birth missing (living people)
American television composers